State Road 16 (SR 16) is an east–west state road in the US state of Indiana. The western terminus is at an intersection with U.S. Highway 41 (US 41), near Ade, and its eastern terminus is at SR 5, near Huntington. The state road runs through seven counties in northern Indiana mostly through rural farm fields and small towns.

Dating back to the early days of the state road system, SR 16 was first signed in the southern part of the state. It was moved to northern Indiana in 1926, running in two segments with the western segment being modern SR 14 from Illinois state line to Rochester and the eastern segment being modern US 224 in Indiana. During the 1930s, SR 16 was moved onto its modern routing from US 41 to SR 5. US 224 replaced SR 16 east of Huntington in the mid-1930s. The final section of SR 16 to be paved, the segment of roadway in Wabash County, was paved in the late 1960s.

Route description 
SR 16 begins at US 41 at an intersection in rural Newton County, just east of Ade. The state road heads east as a two-lane rural highway passing farms and fields, before passing through the town of Brook. East of Brook SR 16 passes over the Iroquois River and through an intersection with SR 55, before crossing into Jasper County. In Jasper County SR 16 crosses over Interstate 65, before an intersection with US 231. Past US 231 the road passes through rural Jasper county before entering White County.

In White County SR 16 crosses over a CSX railroad track before entering Monon. In Monon SR 16 passes mostly houses, before an intersection with US 421. East of US 421 the road crosses another CSX railroad track before passing between North White High School and Monon Elementary School. SR 16 leaves Monon passing through agricultural land in rural White County. The road makes a sharp curve to become north–south before a four-way intersection with SR 39 and 900 North. At this intersection SR 16 and SR 39 head east entering the community of Buffalo. In Buffalo the concurrency turns south and crosses over Tippecanoe River. After the river SR 16 turns east while SR 39 continues south, at this intersection SR 119 begins concurrent with SR 16. SR 16 and SR 119 heads east leaving Buffalo before SR 119 bends north while SR 16 turns south. The road heads south for a mile before a four-way intersection with two county roads, at this intersection SR 16 turns to become east–west. SR 16 leaves White County and enters Cass County.

In Cass County SR 16 passes through Royal Center and an intersection with US 35. Past Royal Center the route passes through farmland in rural Cass County and through an intersections with SR 17 and SR 25 before leaving Cass County and entering Miami County. In Miami County SR 16 has an intersection with US 31, before SR 16 passes through Denver. The concurrency ends with SR 16 turning east while SR 19 continues north. SR 16 crosses over the Eel River as the road leaves Miami County and enters Wabash County.

The road passes through Roann before passing through agricultural land in Wabash County. In rural Wabash County SR 16 has an intersection with SR 15 followed by an intersection with SR 13. Past SR 13, SR 16 leaves Wabash County and enters Huntington County. In Huntington County SR 16 has an intersection with SR 105 before passing through wood and farm land. The SR 16 designation ends at an intersection with SR 5 in rural Huntington County, northwest of the city of Huntington, while the roadway continues east as a county road.

History 
Before 1926 the SR 16 designation was routed between Mount Vernon and New Albany, along a similar routing as modern SR 62. In 1926 SR 16 designation was in two segments, between Illinois state line and Rochester, via Winamac, along modern SR 14. The second segment added to the state road system in 1926 was routed from Huntington to the Ohio state line, along modern US 224. The segment of SR 16 from Illinois state line to Rochester was redesignated as SR 14 between 1928 and 1929. In late 1930 SR 16 was added between US 41 and modern US 231, with the road from modern US 231 to modern SR 15 becoming an authorized addition. Between late 1930 and 1932 SR 16 between SR 29 (now US 35), in Royal Center, and SR 15 (now SR 13), near Urbana, was commissioned. In this time frame SR 16 between US 41 and SR 53, now US 231, was under construction to become a high type of roadway.

During 1932 SR 16 was commissioned between SR 15 and SR 5, while the roadway between US 41 and SR 53 was opened as a high type road surface. Between late 1932 and early 1933 SR 16 between Huntington and Markle was under construction as a high type road surface. US 224 replaced SR 16, between Huntington and the Ohio state line, between 1933 and 1934. In either 1934 or 1935 the road between US 152 (now US 231), and US 35 became an authorized addition to the state road system. The route between US 152 and US 35 was added to the state road system between 1936 and 1937. The entire roadway of SR 16 was paved between 1963 and 1964, excluding the roadway in Wabash County. The segment of roadway in Wabash County was paved in either 1966 and 1967.

Major intersections

References

External links

016
Transportation in Newton County, Indiana
Transportation in Jasper County, Indiana
Transportation in White County, Indiana
Transportation in Cass County, Indiana
Transportation in Miami County, Indiana
Transportation in Wabash County, Indiana
Transportation in Huntington County, Indiana